Following is a List of senators of Wallis and Futuna, people who have represented the collectivity of Wallis and Futuna in the Senate of France.

Background 

Wallis has 13 seats and Futuna has seven, which form 20 seats in the territory. The government of Wallis and Futuna elects one senator by the results of the electoral college's absolute majority vote.

List

References

 
Wallis and Futuna-related lists
Politics of Wallis and Futuna
Wallis